The Parks (Les Parques) or The Poet and the Parks is a 1907 Symbolist painting by the historian and painter Claude Dalbanne (1877-1964), now in the Musée des Beaux-Arts in his home city of Lyon.

Sources
dossier de presse

1907 paintings
Paintings in the collection of the Museum of Fine Arts of Lyon
Symbolist paintings
French paintings